Elections to Eastleigh Council were held on 6 May 1999.  One third of the council was up for election and the Liberal Democrat party kept overall control of the council.

After the election, the composition of the council was
Liberal Democrat 29
Labour 8
Conservative 7

Election result

External links
 BBC report of 1999 Eastleigh election result

1999
1999 English local elections
1990s in Hampshire